Wallander - Mastermind is a 2005 film about the Swedish police detective Kurt Wallander directed by Peter Flinth.

Wallander's team deals with a series of false alarms—until it becomes apparent that there is more to these seemingly harmless cases than meets the eye. Soon, the entire department is on the trail of someone who is clearly pulling everyone's strings, and it is up to them to identify the mastermind behind these schemes before it is too late.

Cast 
Krister Henriksson as Kurt Wallander
Johanna Sällström as Linda Wallander
Ola Rapace as Stefan Lindman
Angela Kovacs as Ann-Britt
Fredrik Gunnarsson as Svartman
Douglas Johansson as Martinsson
Mats Bergman as Nyberg
Michael Nyqvist as Lothar Kraftzcyk
Sally Carlsson as Therese
Suzanna Dilber as Jolanta
Marianne Mörck as Ebba
Frederic Täckström as a policeman in Malmö
Göran Aronsson as Grönkvist
Lisa Lindgren as Elisabeth Martinsson
Stina Ekblad as the dissector
Jan Skott as Ragnar Öberg

References

External links 

Mastermind
2005 films
2000s crime films
Films directed by Peter Flinth
Police detective films
Swedish films about revenge
2000s police procedural films
2000s Swedish films